Live from Las Vegas is a 2005 live album by the American singer Frank Sinatra.

This album forms part of Capitol Records 'Las Vegas Centennial Collection', and showcases a December 1986 concert by Sinatra. This was Sinatra's first live Las Vegas album released since 1966s Sinatra at the Sands. It was recorded at the Golden Nugget Las Vegas.  The album appeared on the Billboard top albums chart for one week in May, 2005, at position 199.

Track listing
Intro ("A Lovely Way to Spend an Evening") [instrumental] (Harold Adamson, Jimmy McHugh) – 0:38
"I've Got the World On a String" (Harold Arlen, Ted Koehler) – 2:25
"What Now My Love" (Gilbert Bécaud, Pierre Delanoë, Carl Sigman) – 2:43
"I Get a Kick Out of You" (Cole Porter) – 4:58
"My Heart Stood Still" (Richard Rodgers, Lorenz Hart)  – 3:27
"Luck Be a Lady" (Frank Loesser) – 5:04
"I've Got a Crush on You" (George Gershwin, Ira Gershwin) – 2:32
"Mack the Knife" (Marc Blitzstein, Bertolt Brecht, Kurt Weill) – 4:30
Monologue – 1:59
"The Girls I Never Kissed" (Leiber and Stoller) – 4:03
"For Once in My Life" (Ron Miller, Orlando Murden) – 2:53
"Someone to Watch Over Me" (G. Gershwin, I. Gershwin) – 3:46
"Maybe This Time" (Fred Ebb, John Kander) – 2:51
"I've Got You Under My Skin" (Porter) – 4:22
"Only One to a Customer" (Carolyn Leigh, Jule Styne) – 3:45
"I Have Dreamed" (Rodgers, Oscar Hammerstein II) – 3:22
"My Way" (Paul Anka, Claude François, Jacques Revaux, Gilles Thibault) – 4:01
"New York, New York" (Kander, Ebb) – 3:55
Bows ("You Are There") (instrumental) (Harry Sukman, Paul Francis Webster) – 0:44

 Tracks 1, 3, 13-17 and 19 recorded on December 27, 1986
 Tracks 4, 8, 10, and 18 recorded on December 31, 1986

Personnel
Frank Sinatra – vocals
Bill Miller - Pianist, conductor
Jim Hughart - Bass
Ron Anthony - Guitarist
Irving Cottler - Drummer
Featuring the Golden Nugget´s Orchestra

References

Frank Sinatra live albums
Live albums published posthumously
2005 live albums
Capitol Records live albums
Live albums recorded in the Las Vegas Valley